The FIL World Luge Championships 1981 took place in Hammarstrand, Sweden for the third time. Hammarstrand had hosted the event previously in 1967 and 1975. It also marked the last time the event took place on a natural track until 2000 with events now moving to the FIL World Luge Natural Track Championships which debuted in 1979.

Men's singles

Women's singles

Men's doubles

Medal table

References
Men's doubles World Champions
Men's singles World Champions
Women's singles World Champions

FIL World Luge Championships
1981 in luge
1981 in Swedish sport
Luge in Sweden